Pizza marinara, also known as pizza alla marinara, is a style of Neapolitan pizza in Italian cuisine seasoned with only tomato sauce, extra virgin olive oil, oregano and garlic. 
It is supposedly the most ancient tomato-topped pizza.

History
It has been claimed the pizza marinara was introduced around the year 1735 (in 1734 according to European Commission regulation 97/2010), and was prepared using olive oil, cherry tomatoes, basil, oregano and garlic at that time, and that historically it was known to be ordered commonly by poor sailors, and made on their ships due to it being made from easily preservable ingredients: all of these claims are however only backed by tradition rather than solid evidence.

Francesco de Bourcard, writing in his 1866 book Usi e costumi di Napoli (Customs and Traditions of Naples), Vol. II (page 124), seemed to know the recipe with a different name, and to consider the addition of tomatoes an extra for both Marinara and Margherita:

Recipe 

According to the Associazione Verace Pizza Napoletana:

In pizzerias in the area of Rome, the recipe is commonly modified with the addition of salted anchovies.

See also
 List of pizza varieties by country
 Marinara sauce

References

Further reading
  SBN IT\ICCU\MOL\0069720

Marinara
Vegan cuisine